Kyle Patrick Hart (born November 23, 1992) is an American professional baseball pitcher in the Philadelphia Phillies organization. He has played in Major League Baseball (MLB) for the Boston Red Sox.

Amateur career
Hart graduated from Sycamore High School in Cincinnati, Ohio. He attended Indiana University, where he played college baseball for the Indiana Hoosiers for five seasons (2012–2016), having undergone Tommy John surgery during his junior year.

Professional career

Boston Red Sox
The Boston Red Sox selected Hart in the 19th round of the 2016 MLB draft. In 2017, Hart appeared in games with the Gulf Coast League Red Sox, Greenville Drive, and Salem Red Sox compiling a 6–5 record in 22 games (19 starts) with a 2.15 earned run average (ERA) while striking out 109 batters in 117 innings pitched. In 2018, Hart spent all of the season with the Double-A Portland Sea Dogs, recording a 3.57 ERA while striking out 100 batters in  innings with a 7–9 record in 24 games (all starts).

In 2019, Hart started the season with Portland, then was promoted to the Triple-A Pawtucket Red Sox in late May; overall for the season, he had a 12–13 record in 77 games (71 starts) with a 3.52 ERA while striking out 140 batters in 156 innings pitched. After the 2019 season, the Red Sox added Hart to their 40-man roster.

During 2020, Hart was optioned to Triple-A Pawtucket on March 8. After the delayed start of the MLB season, the Red Sox named Hart as the starting pitcher for their August 13 game against the Tampa Bay Rays. Making his MLB debut, Hart allowed seven runs (five earned) on seven hits and three walks in two innings of work, taking the loss. Hart was placed on the injured list on September 2, with a left hip impingement, and moved to the 45-day injured list on September 15. With the 2020 Red Sox, Hart made four appearances (three starts), registering an 0–1 record with 15.55 ERA in 11 innings pitched with 13 strikeouts. On November 20, 2020, Hart was outrighted off of the 40-man roster and assigned to Triple-A. Hart spent the 2021 season in Triple-A with the Worcester Red Sox; in 23 games (20 starts), he compiled a 4.22 ERA with 6–9 record while striking out 90 batters in  innings.

Hart began the 2022 season with Worcester, then was assigned to Portland on May 16. He made 24 appearances split between Worcester and Portland in 2022, accumulating a 7-3 record and 5.25 ERA with 74 strikeouts in 82.1 innings pitched. He elected free agency on November 10, 2022.

Philadelphia Phillies
On February 7, 2023, Hart signed a minor league contract with the Philadelphia Phillies organization.

References

External links

1992 births
Living people
Baseball players from Cincinnati
Boston Red Sox players
Greenville Drive players
Gulf Coast Red Sox players
Indiana Hoosiers baseball players
Major League Baseball pitchers
Pawtucket Red Sox players
Portland Sea Dogs players
Salem Red Sox players
Worcester Red Sox players